Sergiu Constantin Luca (born 21 May 2001) is a Romanian professional footballer who plays as a defensive midfielder for Gloria Bistrița-Năsăud, on loan from CFR Cluj.

Club career
Gîdea made his debut for CFR Cluj on 22 May 2022, in a 3–1 Liga I loss with FCSB.

Career statistics

Club

Honours
CFR Cluj
Liga I: 2021–22

References

External links
 
 Sergiu Luca at lpf.ro

2001 births
People from Reghin
Living people
Romanian footballers
Association football midfielders
Liga I players
Liga III players
CFR Cluj players
CS Gloria Bistrița-Năsăud footballers